Bincheng is a district and seat of the city of Binzhou, Shandong province, China.

Administrative divisions
As 2012, this County is divided to 11 subdistricts, 2 towns and 2 townships.

Subdistricts

Towns
 Jiuzhen
 Baoji

Townships
 Shangji Township
 Qinhuangtai Township

References

External links

County-level divisions of Shandong